The FIFA Champions Badge is a kit emblem in the shape of a gold and white shield, awarded by FIFA to the reigning world champions of FIFA competitions, both at national team level (e.g. World Cup, Women's World Cup, Futsal World Cup and FIFA Beach Soccer World Cup) and at club team level (e.g. Club World Cup).

FIFA owns, makes and licenses-out the physical badge, which can only be worn on first-team kits (not on derivative versions, or on training clothing), of the reigning title-holders and is thus a temporary award. FIFA awarded the first badge in February 2008 to Milan, the then-reigning 2007 FIFA Club World Cup champions.

Award

Badge rules

The  badge is shaped like a shield, and displays the image of the relevant trophy, with the inscription FIFA WORLD CHAMPIONS, next to the year in which the relevant FIFA competition had been won.  The badge only comes in two colour schemes – gold letters on a white background, and white letters on a gold background.  The winning national team or club team carries the badge on their shirt until the end of the next edition of the relevant FIFA tournament; thus, it is only worn by reigning champions.

The badge can be displayed on kits from the day the team becomes FIFA world champions, up to and including the day of the final of the next staging of the competition (e.g. if the team wins the competition again, they can hold the badge uninterrupted). The badge can only be worn on the club's official first-team kits (both home and away versions) – being the team that won the relevant FIFA world competition – and cannot be worn on any derivative or retrospective form of these kits, or on any related club training clothing, or by the club's reserve teams/any other of the club's teams.

Commercial aspects

The physical badge is manufactured by a third party on behalf of FIFA (by Unisport in 2019), and orders for the physical badge from kit manufacturers must go through FIFA; a logistical situation that created delays in consumers being able to purchase Nike-made kits of the United States women's national soccer team (USWNT) with the badge in 2019. There have also been concerns that major kit manufacturers such as Nike and Puma, have had issues licensing the FIFA Champions Badge for first-team kits that can be sold to the general public.

As well as the prestige, the award brings commercial benefits to the recipients through sales of kits that include the new FIFA badge.

Non-FIFA competitions

A separate agreement is required to wear the badge in a non-FIFA organised competition. For example, in 2009, the English FA granted Manchester United, the reigning 2008 FIFA Club World Cup holders, permission to wear the badge during FA Cup fixtures but not in the Premier League, and a similar arrangement was sought for Liverpool when they became 2019 holders, but they did grant the club the right to use the badge for one home Premier League fixture, against Wolverhampton Wanderers on 29 December 2019 (their first home match after becoming world champions). In contrast, both Real Madrid and Barcelona were allowed to wear the FIFA Champions Badge on their shirts during all of their Spanish La Liga fixtures.

History

Club teams
The first official award of the badge was made in February 2008 to honour the reigning holders of the FIFA Club World Cup, Italian club Milan, who had won the title in 2007. At the time of the award to Milan, FIFA declared that the three previous winners of the FIFA Club World Cup, Corinthians, São Paulo, and Internacional, could also wear the badge until a new winner was crowned in the 2008 FIFA Club World Cup Final in December. However, when Corinthians won the badge in the 2012 FIFA Club World Cup, FIFA confirmed that it was their first time officially earning the FIFA Champions Badge.

National teams
In September 2008, the badge was extended to the FIFA World Cup and was presented to the defending champions from 2006, Italy, thus becoming the first national team to wear the badge. In 2009, the badge was extended to the FIFA Women's World Cup and awarded to Germany, reigning champions from 2007. The badge was further extended to the FIFA Futsal World Cup in 2012, where it was first won by Brazil. In 2013, the badge was added to the FIFA Beach Soccer World Cup, being first worn by Russia.

The badge has yet to be added for any of FIFA'a age-grade world championships—the U-17 and U-20 World Cups for men and women, the men's Olympic soccer tournament (U-23 with three over-age players allowed per squad), and the men's and women's Youth Olympic futsal tournaments (U-20).

Records

, the following records apply:

Continuous periods
On 22 December 2019, Liverpool ended Real Madrid’s uninterrupted reign as FIFA Club World Cup Champions Badge holders that lasted 1,098 days from 18 December 2016; it was noted as the longest continuous period for which any club team had held a FIFA Champions Badge.
The United States women's national soccer team won the 2019 FIFA Women's World Cup, and has thus been able to keep a FIFA World Cup Champions Badge uninterrupted since 5 July 2015, when they won the 2015 World Cup; this is the longest continuous period for which any national team has held a FIFA Champions Badge (no other national team has yet won the badge twice in succession).

Most wins
 For club teams, Real Madrid has won the right to wear the badge on five separate occasions since its inception, while Barcelona has won the right three times.
 For national football teams, the United States women's team has won the right to wear the badge on two separate occasions since its inception; no men's or other women's football team has won the right more than once.
 For other national teams, the Portugal national beach soccer team and the Russia national beach soccer team have won the right twice.

National team winners

Association football 

Male

Female

Futsal 

Male

Beach soccer 
Male

Club team winners 
Male

See also

 Scudetto
 The Best FIFA Football Awards
 FIFA Club World Cup awards

Notes

References

External links
 The FIFA World Champions Badge

FIFA trophies and awards
Sports symbols